István Csukás (2 April 1936 – 24 February 2020) was a Hungarian poet and author of Jassic descent. He was awarded the Kossuth Prize in 1999, the most prestigious literary prize of Hungary.

Awards
Attila József Prize (1977 and 1978)
Ifjúsági Prize (1978 and 1982)
Literary prize of the Tekintet Foundation (1997)
Kossuth Prize (1999)
Prima Primissima Award (2011)

Works

Poetry
Elmondani adj erőt! (1962)
Előszó a szerelemhez (1965)
Koromcsillag (1968)
Ima a vadevezősökért (1975)
Egy kiscsacsi története (1975)
A felidézett toronyszoba (1977)
Az üres papír elégiája (1980)
Mintha átvágnánk Tahitin (1982)
Süsü újabb kalandjai (1983)
Orr-beszámoló a Szépvölgyi út 67-től a Kolosy térig (1985)
Mint az ejtőernyősök (1986)
Metszet az Időből, Szárszó, nyár (1989)
Étellift a pokolba (1995)
Összegyűjtött versek (1996)
Költők éhkoppon (1996)
Sün Balázs (1997)
Az én játékoskönyvem (1998)
Csukás István nagy mesekönyve (2001)
A házőrző macska (2002)
A versíró kutya (2003)
Ló az iskolában (2007)
De szép az erdő (2007)
Vidám állatkert (2007)
Te mire gondolsz közben? (2008)

Novels
Egy szürke kiscsacsi (1967)
Mirr-Murr, a kandúr (1969)
Pintyőke cirkusz, világszám! (1971)
A téli tücsök meséi (1974)
Hogyan fogtam el Settenkedő Tódort? (1978)
Utazás a szempillám mögött (1978)
Szegény Gombóc Artúr (1979)
A radírpók (1979)
Süsü, a sárkány (1980)
Festéktüsszentő Hapci Benő (1980)
Hogyan lettem filmszínész? (1981)
A bátor Tintanyúl (1981)
Madárvédő Golyókapkodó (1982)
Civakodó cipőikrek (1983)
Oriza-Triznyák (1984)
Pom Pom főz (1985)
A Nagy Ho-ho-ho-horgász (1985)
Az óriástüdejű levegőfújó (1985)
A legkisebb Ugrifüles (1985)
Űrhajó az Orrbolygóról (1986)
A mű-Süsü / A bűvös virág (1986)
Süsü csapdába esik / Süsü és a Sárkánylány (1987)
Lesből támadó ruhaszárítókötél (1987)
Kelekótya kandúrok (1987)
A Nagy Ho-ho-ho-horgászverseny (1987)
Órarugógerincű Felpattanó (1987)
Hapci-rakéta a Hókuszpókusz-szigetekre (1987)
A magányos szamovár (1988)
Vakkancs szétnéz Budapesten (1989)
Tappancs (1989)
Cillancs felfedezi a világot (1989)
Brum Brum Brúnó (1989)
A kelekótya kiskakas (1990)
Kalandozás Betűországban (1990)
Süsü, a sárkány (1993)
Sün és barátai (1998)
Mirr-Murr nyomoz Budapesten (1998)
Süsüke, a sárkánygyerek (1998)
Pom Pom összes meséi (1999)
A Nagy Ho-ho-ho-horgász télen (1999)
Süsüke újabb kalandjai (2000)
Tükörbohócok (2002)
Töf-töf elefánt (2004)
Pom Pom újabb meséi (2005)
Mirr-Murr, Oriza Triznyák és a többiek (2006)
Aszpirin és Lucifer (2007)
Ágacska (2008)
A Nagy Ho-Ho-Ho-horgász kórházban (2009)
A Nagy Ho-Ho-Ho-horgász nyáron (2010)
Mi az adu? (2011)

Youth novels

Keménykalap és krumpliorr (1973)
Nyár a szigeten (1975)
Vakáció a halott utcában (1976)
Csicsóka és a moszkítók (1982)
Berosált a rezesbanda (2013)

Theatre
Ágacska (1981)
Gyalogcsillag (1983)
Kutyánszky Kázmér a versíró kutya (1988)
Mesélj Münchhausen (1991)
Bohóc az egész család (1994)

Film Scripts
Mirr-Murr (1972)
Kiscsacsi kalandjai (1972)
A labda (1974)
Le a cipővel! (1975)
A legkisebb ugrifüles (1976–1977)
Süsü, a sárkány kalandjai (1976–1984)
Keménykalap és krumpliorr (1978)
Vakáció a halott utcában (1979)
Pom Pom meséi (1980–1982)
A nagy ho-ho-ho-horgász (1982–1984)
Sebaj Tóbiás (1983–1985)
Kutyánszky Kázmér, a versíró kutya (1987)
Csicsóka és a Moszkítók (1988)
Mese a motorunkról (1989)
Töf-töf elefánt (1991–1994)
Süni és barátai (1995)
Filléres irodalom (1996)
Süsüke, a sárkánygyerek (2001)
Nem hunyhat ki a láng (2009)
Berosált a rezesbanda (2012)

References

1936 births
2020 deaths
Hungarian male novelists
Hungarian male poets
Hungarian children's writers
20th-century Hungarian male writers
Attila József Prize recipients
20th-century Hungarian novelists
20th-century Hungarian poets
 People from Jász-Nagykun-Szolnok County